

The IPT-2 Aratinga, was a Brazilian monoplane, single-seat glider designed and manufactured by the IPT engineers.

The glider had an outer covering of plywood and canvas, the cabin protected by a bubble canopy, a novelty at the time for gliders. The aircraft was ready a year and a half after the beginning of its construction, and was towed to Cumbica, where it underwent its first flight tests, conducted by Clay Presgrave do Amaral.

Once the tests were concluded, the Aratinga was towed by a de Havilland Tiger Moth aircraft to Rio de Janeiro, with stops made in São José dos Campos and Resende. There it was presented to the public countless times, until it was bought by a young engineer , who kept a small repair shop at Manguinhos Airport. Flight to the end of the decade.

Specifications

See also

 Maeda 703
 CVV-6 Canguro
 Zlin Z-25 Šohaj

References

External links
IPT’s official site
''J2mcL Planeurs site

High-wing aircraft
1940s Brazilian sailplanes
1940s military gliders
Glider aircraft
Aircraft first flown in 1942